The A100 is a range of compact vans and trucks manufactured and marketed from 1964 to 1970 by Chrysler Corporation under the Dodge marque in the United States and the Fargo marque in Canada.

The A100 competed with the Ford Econoline and Chevrolet Van and Chevy Corvair Greenbrier, as well as the Volkswagen Type 2. The range included a pickup truck and van, both with a "forward control" design. Placing the driver on top of the front axle with the engine between the front seats, just behind the front wheels makes it a "cab over" vehicle. The unibody vehicles used a short  wheelbase. An A108 was also available from 1967 to 1970, with a longer  wheelbase. The A108 was popular with camper conversion companies.
A substantially modified, Hemi-powered A100 wheelstanding exhibition pickup called the "Little Red Wagon" driven by Bill "Maverick" Golden was a popular drag strip attraction from the 1960s to the early 2000s.

Engines
1964–1966 170 in3 (2.8 L) Slant-6 I6, 
1970 198 in3 (3.2 L) Slant-6 I6, 
1964–1970 225 in3 (3.7 L) Slant-6 I6, 
1965–1966 273 in3 (4.5 L) LA V8
1967–1970 318 in3 (5.2 L) LA V8,

L-Series trucks
From 1966 to 1971, Dodge built L-Series medium-duty Cabover Engine trucks with a tilting forward-control cab based on the forward body of the A-100.

Dodge A100 in popular culture
The Dodge A100 was featured in the American television series That '70s Show episode "Red's Last Day", as Michael Kelso's new van. It also appeared in the movie Cars as the character Dusty Rust-eze, in the remake of The Texas Chainsaw Massacre, as well as the comedy Stealing Harvard.  An A100 appeared in many different colors in the 1960s Batman TV series. More often than not, it was the preferred getaway vehicle of each episode's villain.

The Dodge Little Red Wagon was a famous exhibition drag racing truck introduced in 1965 based on the A100 pickup.

Gallery

References

External links

 Dodge L600 and L700 (Old Dodges.com)
 Dodge A-100 History (Sweptline.com)

1970s cars
Cab over vehicles
A100
Mid-engined vehicles
Pickup trucks
Rear-wheel-drive vehicles
Vans
Cars introduced in 1964